Göran Johansson (born 12 August 1958) is a Swedish speed skater. He competed in two events at the 1988 Winter Olympics.

References

External links
 

1958 births
Living people
Swedish male speed skaters
Olympic speed skaters of Sweden
Speed skaters at the 1988 Winter Olympics
People from Rättvik Municipality
Sportspeople from Dalarna County
20th-century Swedish people